Karen Mae Reyes (born 17 October 1996) is a Filipina actress. On 7 July 2012, she was declared Second Big Placer of Pinoy Big Brother: Teen Edition 4. She is a typical teenager in her hometown Calapan, Oriental Mindoro before joining the biggest reality show in the Philippines Pinoy Big Brother and finished as the second teen big placer next to Myrtle Sarrosa. Karen Reyes is currently managed and under contract to Star Magic, ABS-CBN's home based talent agency. Reyes is currently member of Star Magic Angels with Sarrosa, Aiko Climaco, Hanna Ledesma, Jed Montero and Shey Bustamante.

==Biography==
Karen Mae Reyes was originally from Makati until she and her family moved to Calapan, Oriental Mindoro, Philippines. Reyes was born to an OFW father who is now deceased, and a carinderia cook/ entrepreneur mother, Ms. Claire Reyes.

Awards

Filmography

Television

Movie

References

External links
Karen Reyes profile at Pinoy Big Brother: Teen Edition 4 website.

1996 births
Living people
People from Oriental Mindoro
Filipino people of Spanish descent
Tagalog people
Pinoy Big Brother contestants
Star Magic
Filipino child actresses
Filipina gravure idols